Franck Junior Evina (born 5 July 2000) is a Cameroonian footballer who plays as a forward for German  club SV Sandhausen.

Club career
In the 2017–18 season, Evina joined the squad of Bayern Munich II, making his debut in the Regionalliga Bayern on 4 August 2017 in a 2–1 home win against 1. FC Schweinfurt, starting the match before being substituted off in the 79th minute for Mario Crnički.

Evina made his Bundesliga debut for the first team on 28 April 2018 in a 4–1 home win against Eintracht Frankfurt, starting the match before being substituted off in the 66th minute for Niklas Süle. On 11 May 2018, Evina signed a professional contract with Bayern, lasting three years until 30 June 2021.

In January 2019, Evina joined 2. Bundesliga side Holstein Kiel on a 1.5-year loan. After limited with playing time in the 2018–19 season, the loan deal was terminated and he was instead sent out on loan at KFC Uerdingen for the 2019–20 season.
He left the club and joined 2. Bundesliga side Hannover 96 on 21 July 2020 for an undisclosed fee. He was loaned out to Viktoria Berlin for the second half of the 2021–22 season. Ahead of the 2022–23 season, Evina was demoted to the reserve team's squad.

On 8 December 2022, Evina signed with 2. Bundesliga club SV Sandhausen.

International career
Evina was eligible to represent Germany or the country of his birth, Cameroon, at international level. He played for Germany's U18 on 12 November 2017 against Italy. In November 2018, he decided to play for Cameroon.

Evina made his debut with the senior Cameroon national team in a friendly 0–0 tie with Japan on 9 October 2020.

Career statistics

Club

References

External links
 Profile at DFB.de
 

2000 births
Living people
Footballers from Yaoundé
Cameroonian footballers
Cameroon international footballers
Cameroon youth international footballers
German footballers
Germany youth international footballers
Cameroonian emigrants to Germany
Association football forwards
FC Bayern Munich II players
FC Bayern Munich footballers
Holstein Kiel players
KFC Uerdingen 05 players
Hannover 96 players
Hannover 96 II players
FC Viktoria 1889 Berlin players
SV Sandhausen players
Bundesliga players
Regionalliga players
2. Bundesliga players
3. Liga players